Giora Spiegel, (born July 27, 1947) is an Israeli former footballer and coach. As a footballer, he holds the record for the longest Israeli international career, spanning 14 years and 357 days.

Biography
Born in Petah Tikva, Giora Spiegel is the son of Eliezer Spiegel, who played for Maccabi Petah Tikva and the Israel national team. He is Jewish. Spiegel attended Herzliya Hebrew High School. In university he studied accountancy.

Playing career
As a youth, he played with Maccabi Tel Aviv, and was marked early on as a future talent. By age 17, he was leading the national U-21 side to Asian championships and by 18, he had been called up to the full side. In the summer of 1970 he played as a forward for the Israel national team at the 1970 World Cup finals in Mexico.

In 1973, he fought with Maccabi manager, Jerry Beit haLevi over transferring to a club in France. He later left for France in 1974 to play for French side Strasbourg, returning in 1979 to rejoin Maccabi.

Managerial career
Spiegel began his career as a manager in Hapoel Petah Tikva in the mid-1980s . After several years he moved to Maccabi Tel Aviv, which won  the State Cup. After problems with some of the players and a 10–0 defeat to Maccabi Haifa, Spiegel was fired.

In 1989, he moved to Bnei Yehuda, which won the Israeli Championship in 1990. In 1993, he moved to Maccabi Haifa. The team won the Israeli Championship that year without losing a single game the whole season. Under his lead, Haifa won the State Cup twice, in 1995 and in 1998.

In 1999, Spiegel returned to Bnei Yehuda. After one unsuccessful season with the club, he moved to Ironi Rishon LeZion for two years.

In July 2007, after an absence of five years from the Israeli football scene, Spiegel was hired by Beitar Jerusalem as its  general manager. That year, the team won the Double. In August 2008, he retired.

Honours

As a player
Maccabi Tel Aviv
Israeli championships: 1967–68, 1969–70, 1971–72, 1978–79
Israel State Cup: 1966–67, 1969–70, 1976–77
Asian Club Championship: 1968–69, 1970–71

Israel
AFC Youth Championship: 1965

Individual
 Member of the Israeli Football Hall of Fame (2009)

As manager
Maccabi Tel Aviv
Israeli state cup: 1988
Bnei Yehuda
Israeli league championship: 1989–90
Maccabi Haifa
Israeli league championship: 1993–94
Israeli state cup: 1993, 1995

See also
List of select Jewish association football (soccer) players

References

External links

Stats at Bnei Yehuda

1947 births
Living people
Herzliya Hebrew Gymnasium alumni
Israeli footballers
Association football midfielders
Maccabi Tel Aviv F.C. players
Israel international footballers
1968 AFC Asian Cup players
1970 FIFA World Cup players
RC Strasbourg Alsace players
Ligue 1 players
Olympique Lyonnais players
Beitar Tel Aviv F.C. players
Hakoah Maccabi Ramat Gan F.C. players
Israeli football managers
Maccabi Haifa F.C. managers
Hapoel Petah Tikva F.C. managers
Footballers at the 1968 Summer Olympics
Olympic footballers of Israel
Footballers from Petah Tikva
Israeli people of German-Jewish descent
Israeli expatriate footballers
Expatriate footballers in France
Israeli expatriate sportspeople in France